AICF may refer to:
 Acoustic Inertial Confinement Fusion, official term for bubble fusion
All India Carrom Federation
All India Chess Federation
America Israel Cultural Foundation
American Indian College Fund